Nealey is a surname. Notable people with the surname include: 

Darwin R. Nealey (1919–2002), American politician
Paul Nealey, American molecular engineer
Terry Nealey (born 1947), American politician

See also
 Nealy

English-language surnames